Don't Look Down is the fourth solo studio album by American hip hop artist Mr. Lif. It was released by Mello Music Group on April 15, 2016. A music video was created for "Let Go".

Critical reception

Sheldon Pearce of Pitchfork gave the album a 7.0 out of 10, saying, "Don't Look Down openly acknowledges doubt but never succumbs to it, instead using it as a balance for self-righteousness." Aaron McKrell of HipHopDX gave the album a 3.7 out of 5, calling it "a captivating foray into the struggles of humanity and the way to overcome them."

On April 15, 2016, BrooklynVegan included it on the "Five Notable Releases of the Week" list. On June 14, 2016, The New York Observer placed it at number 7 on the "Best Hip-Hop Albums of 2016 (So Far)" list. Allan Raible of ABC News placed it at number 47 on the "50 Best Albums of 2016" list.

Track listing

References

External links
 

2016 albums
Mr. Lif albums
Mello Music Group albums